Ole Eduard Fischer Madsen (21 December 1934 – 26 March 2006) was a Danish international footballer, who scored 42 goals in 50 matches for the Denmark national team and competed at the 1964 European Nations' Cup. He is best remembered for scoring on a heel kick against Sweden in 1965. He played 11 seasons for Danish lower-league clubs, before signing a professional contract for Dutch club Sparta Rotterdam, winning the 1966 KNVB Cup with the team.

In 1964, he was named Danish Player of the Year and became the first Dane to receive a vote in the European Footballer of the Year poll. Ole Madsen was regarded as the most popular Danish footballer since Pauli Jørgensen.

Club career
Despite his qualities, Ole Madsen never played in the top-flight Danish championship, but stayed with local lower-league clubs. Madsen made his senior debut with minor league team BK Stefan in 1954. In 1958, he moved to Danish 3rd Division team Hellerup IK (HIK). He helped HIK gain promotion for the Danish 2nd Division for the 1961 season, where the club stayed for three seasons. For the 1964 season, HIK was relegated to the 3rd Division once more.

Despite a low-key club career, Madsen's international performances for the Denmark national team got the attention of European professional clubs. As an amateur player, he was a free agent able to sign with any professional club without the need of a transfer fee. In 1963, a contract with Italian club Atalanta was hindered by a broken nose and subsequent hospitalization. He was offered a contract by Spanish club FC Barcelona in 1964, but he turned it down in order to stay an amateur with the Denmark national team and HIK in the Danish 3rd Division. In 1965, Madsen signed a professional contract with Dutch team Sparta Rotterdam, where he enjoyed success. He stayed three seasons with Sparta, with whom he won the 1966 KNVB Cup. He scored the only goal, as Sparta beat ADO Den Haag 1–0 in the KNVB Cup final. In the Eredivisie championship, he scored a total 22 goals in 71 games for Sparta.

When his contract with Sparta ended in 1968, several big clubs were poised to sign Madsen. However, he decided to return to Denmark in 1968, in order to play for HIK in the 3rd Division. He tried, unsuccessfully, to move HIK towards his own, more professional ways. He was forced to end his career with HIK in 1969, following an injury sustained while playing an international game for Denmark.

International career
Within his first year at HIK, Madsen made his debut for the Denmark national team in October 1958. He was not selected for the 1960 Summer Olympics, but became a mainstay in the team following that tournament. He was eventually named team captain, and scored six goals in three games against Luxembourg to help Denmark qualify for the 1964 European Nations' Cup. He captained Denmark to a fourth-place finish in the final tournament. That year, Madsen was the first Danish player ever to receive votes in the European Footballer of the Year poll, getting one point and a shared 19th place. He was subsequently named 1964 Danish Player of the Year.

On 20 June 1965, Madsen scored an extraordinary goal in an international game against the Sweden. The ball fell to him in an inconvenient angle, with himself facing away from goal, but he hit the ball awkwardly with his heel, and it went past Swedish goalkeeper Arne Arvidsson for a 1–0 lead. Denmark eventually won the game 2–1, the first Danish victory against their neighbors in 14 years. He was then seen as the most popular Danish footballer since Pauli Jørgensen. When he signed a professional contract in 1965, he was automatically banned from the amateur-only national team.

Following his return to HIK in 1968, Madsen was once more part of the Danish selection. He was the first player to benefit from new rules by the Danish Football Association allowing ex-professionals to re-enter the national team. He was called up for Denmark in May 1969, and scored two goals in seven games, before injuring his cruciate ligaments in a September 1969 game against the Norway. This was the last international game for Madsen. He ended his career with 42 international goals, the third overall goalscorer for Denmark behind Poul "Tist" Nielsen (52) and Pauli Jørgensen (47). Since then, Jon Dahl Tomasson has also overtaken Madsen.

Style of play
At 1.71 m of height, Madsen was a short, exceptionally fast striker with immense fighting spirit, and a knack for physical infighting. He had a selfish streak to his game, and would rarely pass the ball to his teammates. This was a source of his extraordinary goalscoring talent, but would sometimes frustrate his teammates.

Honours
Danish Player of the Year: 1964
KNVB Cup: 1966

References

External links
 

1934 births
2006 deaths
Footballers from Copenhagen
Danish men's footballers
Association football forwards
Denmark international footballers
1964 European Nations' Cup players
Eredivisie players
Sparta Rotterdam players
Danish expatriate men's footballers
Danish expatriate sportspeople in the Netherlands
Expatriate footballers in the Netherlands